Diadegma buckelli is a wasp first described by Henry Lorenz Viereck in 1925.
No subspecies are listed.

References

buckelli
Insects described in 1925